Serge Bozon (born 8 November 1972) is a French film director, film critic and actor.

Filmography

Film director 
 1998 : L'Amitié
 2003 : Mods
 2007 : La France
 2013 : Tip Top
 2017 : Madame Hyde

Actor

Awards 
 2002 : Prix Léo Scheer at the  festival de Belfort for Mods
 2007 : Prix Jean Vigo for La France

External links 

 

French film directors
Living people
1972 births
People from Aix-en-Provence
French male film actors
20th-century French male actors
21st-century French male actors
French film critics
French male non-fiction writers